"Reverend" is a song by American rock band Kings of Leon. The song was released as a promotional single on October 6, 2016 through RCA Records from their seventh studio album Walls (2016). It was later sent to alternative radio as the album's second official single on February 17, 2017. The song was written by bandmembers Caleb Followill, Nathan Followill, Jared Followill and Matthew Followill as a tribute to deceased country music singer-songwriter Blaze Foley.

Music video
A music video to accompany the release of "Reverend" was released on February 10, 2017.

Track listing

Charts

Weekly charts

Year-end charts

References

2016 songs
2016 singles
Kings of Leon songs
RCA Records singles
Songs written by Caleb Followill
Songs written by Jared Followill
Songs written by Matthew Followill
Songs written by Nathan Followill